Joginder Singh Bedi was an Indian track and field Paralympic athlete. Singh Bedi competed at the 1984 Summer Paralympics, where he won three medals.

See also
India at the Paralympics

References

Year of birth missing (living people)
Paralympic athletes of India
Living people
Athletes (track and field) at the 1984 Summer Paralympics
Paralympic medalists in athletics (track and field)
Medalists at the 1984 Summer Paralympics
Date of birth missing (living people)
Indian male discus throwers
Indian male javelin throwers
Indian male shot putters
Recipients of the Arjuna Award
Paralympic silver medalists for India
Paralympic bronze medalists for India
Discus throwers with limb difference
Javelin throwers with limb difference
Shot putters with limb difference
Paralympic discus throwers
Paralympic javelin throwers
Paralympic shot putters